HD 208177 is a double star system in the equatorial constellation of Aquarius. They are faintly visible to the naked eye with an apparent magnitude of 6.20. The pair have an angular separation of 19.113″. The primary component is an evolved subgiant star with a stellar classification of F5IV. It has an estimated 163% of the Sun's mass and is about 1.7 billion years old

References

External links
 Image HD 208177

Aquarius (constellation)
208177
Double stars
F-type subgiants
8363
108144
Durchmusterung objects